Horstead is a surname. Notable people with the surname include:

 James Horstead (1898–1989), Anglican bishop of Sierra Leone
 Jill Horstead (born 1967), Canadian swimmer

See also
 Horsted (disambiguation)